The 2023 AFC Beach Soccer Asian Cup is the 10th edition (3rd official edition) of the AFC Beach Soccer Asian Cup (previously the AFC Beach Soccer Championship before rebranding from 2021), the premier beach soccer tournament contested by Asian men's national teams, organised by the Asian Football Confederation (AFC).

The tournament will take place in Pattaya, Thailand. The championship also acts as the qualification tournament for Asian teams to the 2023 FIFA Beach Soccer World Cup, to be held in the United Arab Emirates. The finalists will qualify to the World Cup including the United Arab Emirates who qualified automatically as host. If the United Arab Emirates reaches the final, then the third-place team will qualify.

Teams 
A total of 16 teams entered the tournament.

Draw 
The draw of the tournament was held on 19 January 2023 in Kuala Lumpur, Malaysia. The 16 teams were drawn into four groups of four teams. The teams were seeded according to their performance in the 2019 AFC Beach Soccer Championship final tournament, with the hosts Thailand automatically seeded and assigned to Position A1 in the draw.

Group stage

Group A

Group B

Group C

Group D

Knockout stage

Bracket

Quarter-finals

Semi-finals
Winners qualified for the 2023 FIFA Beach Soccer World Cup.

Third-place match

Final

Goalscorers

Qualified teams for FIFA Beach Soccer World Cup

• Bold indicates champions for that year.  •• Italic indicates hosts for that year.

References

External links
, the-AFC.com

Beach Soccer Asian Cup
Afc
2023
2023 in beach soccer
International association football competitions hosted by Thailand
2023 in Thai football
AFC
AFC